Enmy Manuel Peña Beltré (born 7 September 1992) is a Dominican professional footballer who plays for Maltese club Valletta and the Dominican Republic national team as a midfielder or right back. He also holds Spanish citizenship.

Club career

St. Andrews F.C.
Peña initially joined St. Andrews F.C. from CD Puerta Bonita on 1 January 2016, before moving to Mosta F.C. exactly six months later on 1 July. He rejoined St. Andrews precisely 2 months later on 1 September, scoring one goal in the league since his return.

On 21 September, Peña assisted his side in a 3–0 win over Maltese side Sliema Wanderers with a solo goal where he ran the full length of the pitch and performed a Zidane-turn followed by a nutmeg on two remaining defenders before slotting the ball into the bottom right corner.

Valletta
In January 2018, Peña joined fellow Maltese club Valletta. He made his league debut for the club on 6 January, coming on as a 71st minute substitute for Denni in a 1–0 victory over Senglea Athletic. He had to wait ten months for his first goal, scoring late in a 4–1 league victory over Balzan.

International career
On 10 August 2016 Peña was called up to Dominican Republic national team for two friendlies against Puerto Rico. He made his international debut late in the month, starting in a 5–0 win in an unofficial friendly.

International goals
Scores and results list Dominican Republic's goal tally first.

References

External links
 
 

1992 births
Valletta F.C. players
Living people
People from Azua Province
Dominican Republic footballers
Divisiones Regionales de Fútbol players
Tercera División players
Maltese Premier League players
Mosta F.C. players
Dominican Republic international footballers
Dominican Republic expatriate footballers
Dominican Republic expatriates in Malta
Expatriate footballers in Malta
Dominican Republic emigrants to Spain
Naturalised citizens of Spain
Spanish footballers
St. Andrews F.C. players
Association football defenders
Association football midfielders